A Conspiracy of Stars is the 21st studio album (and most recent album of original material) by British hard rock band UFO, released on 23 February 2015.

Track listing

Personnel
Band members
 Phil Mogg – vocals
 Vinnie Moore – all guitars
 Paul Raymond – keyboards
 Rob De Luca – bass
 Andy Parker – drums

Additional personnel
 Chris Tsangarides – production, recording and mixing
 Helge Engelke – mastering
 Tristan Greatrex – album artwork

Charts

References

External links
Review by Joe at When Prog and Power Unite

2015 albums
UFO (band) albums
SPV/Steamhammer albums
Albums produced by Chris Tsangarides